William Henry Edward Neal (December 31, 1918 – December 27, 1984) was an American football defensive tackle. He played seven seasons for both the Green Bay Packers in the National Football League.

External links

1918 births
1984 deaths
People from Wichita Falls, Texas
Players of American football from Texas
American football defensive linemen
Ouachita Baptist Tigers football players
Tulane Green Wave football players
Green Bay Packers players
Chicago Bears players
Western Conference Pro Bowl players